Friendly City Building and Jail is a historic town hall and jail located at Friendly, Tyler County, West Virginia. It was built in 1901, and is a small, one story frame building.  It has a gable roof and sits on a stone foundation. It has two rooms, the meeting room and jail cell.  It continues to be used by the town as a meeting place for monthly town board meetings.

It was listed on the National Register of Historic Places in 1999.

References

Jails on the National Register of Historic Places in West Virginia
Jails in West Virginia
Government buildings completed in 1901
Infrastructure completed in 1901
Buildings and structures in Tyler County, West Virginia
National Register of Historic Places in Tyler County, West Virginia
Town halls in West Virginia
1901 establishments in West Virginia
City and town halls on the National Register of Historic Places in West Virginia